Surat Municipal Corporation is the local civic body responsible for the administration of Surat, Gujarat which has come into being under the Bombay Provincial Municipal Act, 1949. The Surat Municipal Corporation was established on 2 October 1966. Surat Municipal Corporation area 462.149 sq km. It carries out all the obligatory functions and discretionary functions entrusted by the BPMC Act, 1949 with the following mission.

To make Surat a dynamic, vibrant, self-reliant and sustainable city with all basic amenities, Surat Municipal Corporation perceives its role as the principal facilitator and provider of services as detailed below to provide a better quality of people life.

History 
Surat Municipal Corporation is local self-government that came into being under the provisions of the Bombay Provincial Municipal Act, 1949 carries out all the obligatory & discretionary functions prescribed thereunder.

2021 Results

Services 
Surat Municipal Corporation perceives its role as the principal facilitator and provider of services as detailed below to provide a better quality of life.

Potable water supply

The SMC supplies potable drinking water to the residents of Surat. The water is drawn from the River Tapi and treated at treatment plants in the city. The supplied water received ISO-9000-2008 certification in 2010.

Building homes and shelters for homeless and poorer people in Surat. These homes also provide education, government benefits, social security schemes, and voter IDs to help them live a better life and find jobs to support themselves.

The underground sewage system in the whole city

summer roads only & not like to adopt plastic road since can't earn by SMC Executive Engineer & Contractor

Solid waste management

Health coverage

Primary education and library

Upgrading slums and alternative accommodation

Environment

Entertainment and recreation

Fire Service

Urban planning and development

Transportation
The SMC operates bus services in the city under a public-private partnership.

Administration 
The Surat Municipal Corporation operates under the Provisions of Bombay Provincial Municipal Corporations Act, 1949, under the executive power of the municipal commissioner.

The Surat Municipal Corporation ranked 7th out of 21 Cities for best administrative practices in India in 2014. It scored 3.5 on 10 compared to the national average of 3.3. It is the only city in India to disclose municipal budgets on a weekly basis.

This story is from June 25, 2018
Surat slips in swachhata rank
TNN | Updated: Jun 25, 2018, 10:36 IST

In the Swachh Survekshan 2018 conducted by the Union minister.

See also
List of tourist attractions in Surat

References 

Municipal corporations in India
Municipal corporations in Gujarat
1966 establishments in Gujarat
Organizations established in 1966
Government of Surat